Yury Fyodorovich Kovalyov (6 February 1934 – 25 September 1979) was a Soviet footballer.

International career
Kovalyov played his only game for USSR on 24 November 1957 in a 1958 FIFA World Cup qualifier against Poland. He was not selected for the final tournament squad. He was selected for the squad for the first ever European Nations' Cup in 1960, where the Soviets were champions, but did not play in any games at the tournament.

External links
Profile (in Russian)

1934 births
People from Orekhovo-Zuyevo
1979 deaths
Russian footballers
Soviet footballers
Soviet Union international footballers
1960 European Nations' Cup players
UEFA European Championship-winning players
FC Lokomotiv Moscow players
FC Dynamo Kyiv players
PFC CSKA Moscow players
FC Metallurg Lipetsk players
Ukrainian people of Russian descent
Association football midfielders
Sportspeople from Moscow Oblast